is the 11th single by the Japanese girl idol group 9nine,  released in Japan on November 14, 2012, on the label SME Records (a subsidiary of Sony Music Entertainment Japan).

It is a double A-side single.

The physical CD single debuted at number 11 in the Oricon weekly singles chart.

Background 
The single was released in four versions: Limited Editions A and B and Regular Editions 1 and 2.

Both limited editions had an additional track on the CD. Also Limited Edition A included a bonus DVD with two versions of the music video for "Brave", and Limited Edition B included a bonus DVD with two versions of the music video for "Yie Ar! Jiang Shi feat. Hao Hao! Jiang Shi Girl".

Each edition had a different cover.

Track listing

Regular Edition A

Limited Edition A

Regular Edition B

Limited Edition B

Charts

References

External links 
 Limited Edition A at Sony Music
  (The video is available only in Japan.)

2012 singles
Japanese-language songs
9nine songs
2012 songs
SME Records singles